Carroll L. Hooser (born March 5, 1944 in Dallas, Texas) is a retired professional basketball power forward who spent one season in the American Basketball Association as a member of the Dallas Chaparrals during the 1967–68 season. He was drafted by the Detroit Pistons during the 1967 NBA draft from Southern Methodist University.

External links
 

1944 births
Living people
American men's basketball players
Basketball players from Dallas
Dallas Chaparrals players
Detroit Pistons draft picks
Power forwards (basketball)
SMU Mustangs men's basketball players